Damodar may refer to:

Indian religion and mythology
Damodar (name of Krishna), the 367th Name of Vishnu from the Vishnu Sahasranāma

Geography
 Damodar River in India
 Damodar Himalaya - a sub-range of the Nepal Himalaya in Gandaki Province
 A union of Phultala Upazila in Khulna district, Bangladesh

People
 Damodar Bhandari, member of 2nd Nepalese Constituent Assembly from CPN (UML)
 Damodar Das Arora a famous Punjabi poet
 Damodar K. Mavalankar an Indian theosophist
 Damodar Pande - First Prime Minister of Nepal
 Damodar Raao - Music Director, Actor, and Singer
 Vinayak Damodar Savarkar
 Damodar, a character in the films Dungeons & Dragons and Dungeons & Dragons: Wrath of the Dragon God